Chinese silver is an alloy used for jewelry. Its composition is 38% copper, 17.5% zinc, 11.5% nickel, 11% cobalt, and 2% silver.

External links
National Pollutant Inventory - Copper and compounds fact sheet

Copper alloys